The Voiland College of Engineering and Architecture is one of eleven colleges at Washington State University.

History
The Voiland College of Engineering and Architecture was established in 1917 as the College of Mechanical Arts and Engineering upon the reorganization of the State College of Washington, but its roots trace back to the original establishment of Washington State University in 1890 that included a mechanical engineering program. The college was renamed in 2014 in recognition of Gene Voiland, a 1969 alumnus of the college, and his wife Linda's ongoing contributions to the college and industries.

Academic departments and programs
The college is structured into five departments:
The Gene and Linda Voiland School of Chemical Engineering and Bioengineering
Department of Civil and Environmental Engineering
School of Design and Construction, with programs in architecture, interior design, landscape architecture, and construction management
School of Electrical Engineering and Computer Science
School of Mechanical and Materials Engineering

References

External links

Washington State University
Educational institutions established in 1917
Engineering schools and colleges in the United States
Engineering universities and colleges in Washington (state)
1917 establishments in Washington (state)
Education in Whitman County, Washington